Mal Adarsha Bidya Bhaban is a co-educational higher secondary school at Malbazar subdivision, in Jalpaiguri district, West Bengal, India.

History
Mal Adarsha Bidya Bhaban, established in 1948, is one of the oldest schools in Malbazar subdivision of Jalpaiguri district, situated in the Indian state of West Bengal. It is a co educational government sponsored higher secondary school. The school was established on 23 January 1948 at the present location with limited resources. Initially the sergeants quarters of British rulers were used as school premises.

Campus
It is situated beside NH 31C, Malbazar, district Jalpaiguri.

Academics
The school offers education from class V to class XII. It is a multipurpose school with three streams : Science, Humanities and Commerce.

It is the only school in Western Dooars with Science, Humanities and Commerce stream together. The co-ed school about 1600 enrolled. The faculty membership is about 40. The student teacher ratio is about 40 : 1. There are 40 classrooms and 7 laboratories in the school campus.

The school is affiliated to the West Bengal Board of Secondary Education and the West Bengal Council of Higher Secondary Education.

Co curricular activities
The school regularly represents in various sporting events at zonal, district and state levels.

See also
Education in India
List of schools in India
Education in West Bengal

References

External links

Co-educational schools in India
Schools in Jalpaiguri district
1948 establishments in West Bengal
Educational institutions established in 1948